Wangchunmen Subdistrict is a Subdistrict in Xiangxiang City, Hunan Province, People's Republic of China.

Cityscape
The township is divided into three villages and four community, the following areas: Dongfeng Community, Wumenqian Community, Yunmensi Community, Sangzao Community, Chengbei Village, Jintang Village, and Lianmeng Village (东风社区、务门前社区、云门寺社区、桑枣社区、城北村、金塘村、联盟村).

References

External links

Divisions of Xiangxiang